Bank of Estonia is the central bank of Estonia and a member of the Eurosystem organisation of euro area central banks.

The Bank of Estonia also belongs to the European System of Central Banks. It became a part of the European Central Bank (ECB) when Estonia adopted the euro on 1 January, 2011. Until then, the bank was responsible for the former national Estonian currency, the kroon.

The Governor of the Bank of Estonia, currently Madis Müller, is a member of the Governing Council of the European Central Bank.

TALIBOR
Prior to the introduction of the euro, TALIBOR or the Tallinn Interbank Offered Rate was a daily reference rate based on the interest rates at which banks offer to lend unsecured funds to other banks in the Estonian wholesale money market (or interbank market in Estonian kroons). TALIBOR was published daily by the Bank of Estonia, together with TALIBID (Tallinn Interbank Bid Rate).

TALIBOR was calculated based on the quotes for different maturities provided by reference banks at about 11.00 am each business day by disregarding highest and lowest quotation and calculating arithmetic mean of the quotations.

History

1919: establishment
The bank was established on 24 February 1919 by the provisional government of Estonia following the independence of Estonia. In 1921, Eesti Pank was made the national bank and given the duty of printing the Estonian mark.

1927: Introduction of the first kroon
A new version of the Statutes was approved in 1927, according to which Eesti Pank became an independent note-issuing central bank with limited functions. The main tasks of the bank remained to guarantee the value of the money through currency circulation and through the arrangement and regulation of short-term credit volume. Through the sale of government securities, the bank became a true joint-stock bank.

A foreign loan of GBP 1.35 million (27.6 million kroon) supplemented the foreign currency reserves, of which Eesti Pank received GBP 1 million. The gold and foreign currency reserves of the State Treasury were also transferred to the central bank. The fixed capital of the bank was increased from 2.5 million kroon to 5 million kroon. The sizes of the issues in relation to the reserves backing the kroon were determined. Long-term loans that had become illiquid were transferred to the Long Term Loan Bank, founded specifically for the purpose of releasing Eesti Pank from this burden. Upon the Soviet invasion of 1940, Eesti Pank was nationalized as "the Estonian Republican Office of the State Bank of the Soviet Union". With the nationalization and the introduction of the Russian ruble as legal tender, it lost much of its functions.

1990: Reestablishment
Eesti Pank recommenced operations on 1 January 1990 after an interval of 50 years, though not yet as the central bank of an independent country. The fact that it was possible to restore the central bank in spite of the fact that Estonia was not yet independent was a paradox of that time. The Statutes of Eesti Pank were confirmed in March 1990, and 400 million rubles were allocated for the statutory fund. According to the Statutes, Eesti Pank was an independent public organisation, an issue centre subordinate to the highest authority of the Estonian SSR. The main tasks of the bank included the following: 
 developing an economic strategy for the country and its execution in the field of currency circulation
 the provision of credit, financing, settlements, and foreign currency relations
 management of the currency and credit system
 securing the stability of currency circulation; guaranteeing the purchasing power of the national currency and determining its exchange rate in relation to other currencies.

Foreign Trade Bank take-over
Eesti Pank took over the Tallinn branch of the Foreign Trade Bank of the Soviet Union, re-organising it into the Foreign Currency Operations Centre of Eesti Pank. The central bank also attempted to take other steps within its ability for the liberalisation of the economy and in order to make the transition to a market economy: it began organising currency auctions, publishing quotations of the number of rubles in circulation, issuing licenses for foreign payments and settlements, etc.

Introduction of regulatory function
At the same time it was necessary to begin transforming Eesti Pank into an actual regulator of the Estonian banking sector. At that time, settlements were performed through Moscow, the local Clearing Centre being subordinate to Moscow. In the first years, Eesti Pank was not yet able to regulate and inspect the operations of the local commercial banks.

Reserves
The formation of reserves backing the kroon was commenced. After the recognition of Eesti Pank as the legal successor of the central bank of the Republic of Estonia, established in 1919 during the independence period, the government of Great Britain decided to return the gold that had belonged to the pre-war Eesti Pank to Estonia. The restoration of the membership of Eesti Pank in the Bank for International Settlements was accompanied by the restoration of its rights to the gold and other assets deposited there. Reserve felling areas from the State Forest Fund worth 150 million dollars were also included in the balance sheet of Eesti Pank as an additional foreign currency reserve (although the latter had more a moral and an emotional value for the general public than a practical one).

Reintroduction of the kroon
The new banknotes (the second kroon) reached Estonia in April 1992. The Estonian kroon was pegged to the German Deutschmark to ensure stability. The German Bundesbank was informed of this. The Estonian kroon was declared the sole legal tender in circulation and Eesti Pank the only regulator of monetary relations in Estonia. Within three days, 1500 rubles were exchanged to krooni for each resident natural person at the rate of 1 kroon = 10 rubles. Almost the entire amount of rubles in circulation in Estonia was exchanged to kroons at the same rate (deposits, money held by enterprises, etc.). The rate was considered under-priced by many opponents, but it actually corresponded to the market rate of that time. Time and the later course of events have indisputably proven the correctness of the choice made. All the laws and other legal acts planned for the beginning of the monetary reform came into effect. Eesti Pank began to publish daily exchange rates of the Estonian kroon against the most important foreign currencies.

2011: Introduction of the euro
With the introduction of the euro on 1 January 2011, the Bank of Estonia became a member of the Eurosystem or the system of Eurozone central banks that of that collectively set and implement the zone's monetary policy. Some of the functions of the bank were taken over by the European Central Bank. Other functions, as well as membership to the European System of Central Banks remained.

Chairmen
 Mihkel Pung (March 1919 – August 1919)
 Eduard Aule (October 1921 – October 1925)
 Artur Uibopuu (October 1925 – November 1926)
 Jüri Jaakson (November 1926 – July 1940)
  (July 1940 – October 1940; ?)
   (1944–1949; in exile)
    (21 January 1968 – 31 December 1980; in in exile)
 Rein Otsason (28 December 1989 – 23 September 1991)
 Siim Kallas (23 September 1991 – 27 April 1995)
 Vahur Kraft (27 April 1995 – 7 June 2005)
 Andres Lipstok (7 June 2005 – 7 June 2012)
 Ardo Hansson (7 June 2012 – 7 June 2019)
 Madis Müller (7 June 2019 – Present)

See also 

 Euribor
 RIGIBOR
 Estonian kroon
 Estonian mark
 Economy of Estonia
 Economy of Europe

References

External links
 Bank of Estonia official site
 Bank of Estonia official site 
 New rules for fixing TALIBOR and TALIBID introduced by Eesti Pank

Economy of Estonia
Estonia
Estonia
1919 establishments in Estonia
Banks established in 1919